Carlos Devonn Polk (born February 22, 1977) is an American football coach and former linebacker who is the assistant special teams coach for the Chicago Bears of the National Football League (NFL). He previously served as an assistant coach for the Jacksonville Jaguars, Dallas Cowboys, Tampa Bay Buccaneers, San Diego Chargers and Grossmont College.

Polk played college football at the University of Nebraska and was drafted by the San Diego Chargers in the fourth round of the 2001 NFL Draft. He played for 8 seasons in the NFL with the Chargers and Dallas Cowboys.

Early years
Polk attended Guilford High School in Rockford, Illinois, where he was a standout linebacker for the Vikings football team. As a senior, he recorded 152 tackles, 13 quarterback sacks, 3 fumble recoveries, 3 blocked kicks and one interception.

He finished as one of the all-time leading tacklers in the state of Illinois high school history, with 453 career tackles, while also tallying 10 fumble recoveries, 7 blocked kicks, 5 interceptions and 30 tackles for loss. He received All-conference (three times), All-state, USA Today All-American and Northern Illinois Conference-9 Defensive Player of Year honors. He also practiced basketball.

Playing career

College
Polk accepted a football scholarship from the University of Nebraska. As a redshirt freshman, he was a part of a team that won the 1997 National Championship. He appeared in 12 games, posting 32 tackles (6 for loss) and one sack.

As a sophomore, he appeared all 13 games, making 22 tackles (5 for loss), one pass defensed, 2 forced fumbles, one fumble recovery and one interception.

As a junior, he became a starter at middle linebacker, registering 83 tackles (second on the team), 12 tackles for loss (second on the team), 6.5 sacks (second on the team) and 21 quarterback hurries (led the team).

As a senior, he led the team with 90 tackles, while making 9 tackles for loss, 13 quarterback hurries (second on the team), one interception and 5 passes defensed. He finished his college career with 227 tackles (14th all-time in school history), 32 tackles for loss (9th all-time in school history) and 10 sacks.

In 2010, he was inducted into the Nebraska Football Hall of Fame.

National Football League

Pre-Draft

San Diego Chargers
Polk was selected by the San Diego Chargers in the fourth round (112th overall) of the 2001 NFL Draft. As a rookie, he played 6 games on special teams, finishing with 4 tackles after being placed on the injured reserve list with a torn rotator cuff injury on November 14.

In 2002, he was voted by teammates as the Chargers Special Teams Player of the Year, after leading the team with 13 tackles. He also registered his first-career safety and first-career blocked kick. In 2003, he was voted as the Chargers co-Special Teams Player of Year, after tying for the team lead with 16 tackles.

In 2004, he was declared inactive in the first game with a shoulder injury, he played in the second game against the New York Jets, only to be placed on the injured reserve list with a dislocated left shoulder on September 21. In 2005, he suffered an Achilles injury in the final off-season coaching session and was placed on the injured reserve list on July 28.

In 2006, he filled-in for a suspended Shawne Merriman in the first 4 games of the season. He went on to enjoy his best professional season, posting 32 defensive tackles, 2 sacks and 19 special teams tackles (second on the team) and received the team's Ed Block Courage Award.

In 2007, he started two games at inside linebacker in place of an injured Matt Wilhelm. On November 20, he was placed on the injured reserve list with a left shoulder injury he sustained in the November 18 game against the Jacksonville Jaguars, at the time he was leading the team with 11 special teams tackles. At the end of the year, he shared the team's Most Inspirational Player Award with Philip Rivers. Polk was released on August 30, 2008.

Dallas Cowboys
On October 16, 2008, Polk was signed as a free agent by the Dallas Cowboys, reuniting with head coach Wade Phillips, who was his defensive coordinator with the San Diego Chargers. He was signed for depth purposes after special teams player Sam Hurd was lost for the year with a high left-ankle sprain injury and Kevin Burnett was limited with a calf injury. He finished with 10 special teams tackles (sixth on the team), one forced fumble and one blocked punt. He wasn't re-signed at the end of the season.

Coaching career

Grossmont College
In 2009, Polk began his coaching career at Grossmont College as their assistant special teams coach.

San Diego Chargers
In 2010, Polk was hired by the San Diego Chargers as their assistant special teams coach.

Dallas Cowboys
In 2013, Polk was hired by the Dallas Cowboys as a coaching intern under head coach Jason Garrett.

Tampa Bay Buccaneers
In 2014, Polk was hired by the Tampa Bay Buccaneers as their assistant special teams coach.

Dallas Cowboys (second stint)
In 2019, Polk returned an was hired by the Dallas Cowboys as their assistant special teams coach, reuniting with head coach Jason Garrett. In January 2020, he was not retained by the Cowboys new head coach Mike McCarthy.

Jacksonville Jaguars
On January 31, 2021, Polk was hired by the Jacksonville Jaguars as their assistant special teams coach under coordinator Brian Schneider and head coach Urban Meyer.

Chicago Bears
On February 11, 2022, Polk was hired as the assistant special teams coach by the Chicago Bears under new head coach Matt Eberflus and special teams coordinator Richard Hightower.

References

External links
 Dallas Cowboys profile
Nebraska Cornhuskers profile

1977 births
Living people
Sportspeople from Rockford, Illinois
Players of American football from Illinois
American football linebackers
Nebraska Cornhuskers football players
San Diego Chargers players
Dallas Cowboys players
Tampa Bay Buccaneers coaches
Dallas Cowboys coaches
African-American coaches of American football
African-American players of American football
Jacksonville Jaguars coaches
San Diego Chargers coaches
21st-century African-American sportspeople
20th-century African-American sportspeople
Chicago Bears coaches
Ed Block Courage Award recipients